Brickellia adenolepis is a Mexican species of flowering plants in the family Asteraceae. It is native to west-central Mexico in the States of Zacatecas, Jalisco, and Aguascalientes.

References

adenolepis
Flora of Mexico
Plants described in 1913